Forbhlaith (written also as Forflissa, Ferelith, Fernelith or Forueleth) was the latter of two heiresses of Atholl, the other being her sister Isabella. She married David de Hastings, a French knight who already possessed minor lands in Angus. They were, however, without a son when David died in 1247. They were succeeded by their daughter Ada.

References

Further reading

 
 
Forbhlaith (Scottish Gaelic Given Names for Women)

13th-century deaths
People from Perth and Kinross
Year of birth unknown
Mormaers of Atholl
13th-century mormaers